Aleksandar Popović (Ub, Serbia, November 2, 1929 — Belgrade, October 9, 1996) was a Serbian writer who authored more than 50 plays and other works, of which the most famous are Bela kafa and Mrešćenje šarana.

Biography 
Born in Ub to a family with military background, Popović graduated from the gymnasium in his hometown and soon after started to write poetry. In the late 40s he was arrested by the communist authorities and spent five years at Goli Otok. After release he worked a number of poorly paid jobs, only to accept the invitation of Duško Radović to start writing radio dramas for children. His opus includes a number of dramas, comedies, dramas for children, TV dramas, TV and movie scripts.

Popović's theatre play Mrešćenje šarana was banned in Yugoslavia.

Selected works
Devojčica u plavoj haljini, 1961 
Tvrdoglave priče, 1962  
Sudbina jednog Čarlija, 1964  
Ljubinko i Desanka, 1964  
Sudbina jednog Čarlija, 1964  
Čarapa od sto petlji, 1965
Sablja dimiskija, 1965  
Razvojni put Bore Šnajdera, 1967  
Smrtonosna motoristika, 1967  
Kako se voli Vesna, 1974  
Mrešćenje šarana, 1984  
Gardijski potporučnik Ribanac ili Fantazija o cvećkama, 1984  
Tri svetlice s pozornice, 1986  
Bela kafa, 1990  
Tamna je noć, 1992  
Čarlama, zbogom, 1995  
Baš bunar, 1996  
Noćna frajla, 1999

References 

Serbian screenwriters
Male screenwriters
Serbian dramatists and playwrights
Serbian satirists
Serbian writers
People from Ub, Serbia
1996 deaths
1929 births
20th-century screenwriters